Gary Scalese was an American rock musician and the lead guitarist on the Iron City Houserockers first album, Love's So Tough.  He is credited on Joe Grushecky's Myspace page as "Gary Scalese (R.I.P.)". He died of natural causes at the age of 38 on Friday, August 24, 1990 in St. Petersburg, Florida.  He is also credited on two compilation albums, Pumping Iron & Sweating Steel: The Best of the Iron City Houserockers and Outtakes And Demos 1975–2003 for work done during the 1975–1979 period.

1990 deaths
American rock guitarists
American male guitarists
Year of birth missing